Idskenhuizen  is a village in De Fryske Marren municipality in the province of Friesland, the Netherlands. It had a population of around 480 in 2017.

History
The village as first mentioned in 1495 as Eesken hwsen, and means "settlement of Eesk/Eeske (person)". Around 1500, the villa Roordastins was located near the village. In 1840, it was home to 296 people. The Protestant church dates from 1889, and is a replacement of an earlier church.

Before 2014, Idskenhuizen was part of the Skarsterlân municipality and before 1984 it was part of Doniawerstal.

Gallery

References

External links

De Fryske Marren
Populated places in Friesland